Barrow Hill Local Nature Reserve is a local nature reserve situated in Pensnett in the county of West Midlands, England. Its most distinctive feature, Barrow Hill, is the eroded remnant of a high level igneous intrusion that was formed 315 million years ago during the Carboniferous period. The reserve was created in 2005.

History
The area was once woodland inside Pensnett Chase, which was mainly common land under the lordship of the Barons of Dudley. The hard volcanic rock (dolerite) that forms Barrow Hill was quarried in the 19th century for use as road stone. Another reminder of the industrial age in the reserve is a footpath that follows the course of one of the Earl of Dudley's private railways. The reserve was created in 2005.

Location
The reserve is located at Pensnett, near to St Marks Church and Russells Hall Hospital. Access is via Vicarage Lane, Pensnett.

Landscape
The reserve is dominated by Barrow Hill, the remains of an extinct volcano. The effects of quarrying for dolerite can be clearly seen. The quarrying removed the two barrows (Bronze Age burial mounds) that gave the hill its name. Exposed rock faces in the quarries reveal volcanic features, such as hexagonal pillars that formed during the cooling of the magma.

The area contains woodland, such as Barrow Hill Copse, along with meadowland and ponds.

References

Local Nature Reserves in the West Midlands (county)
Carboniferous volcanoes